Bystrzyca Dolna  is a village in the administrative district of Gmina Świdnica, within Świdnica County, Lower Silesian Voivodeship, in south-western Poland. Prior to 1945 it was in Germany.

History

In all history village has 13 names:

"Bistritcza - 1149/50 r., Wistricz - 1330 r., Wystricza - 1300 r., Polnisch Weistritz - 1318 r., Wistricz - 1334 r., Wistricia polonicalis - 1340 r., Polnisschen Weissericz - 1362 r., Polnisch Weistritz - 1372 r., Polnischweistric - 1666 r., Pohl (nisch) Weiseritz - 1743 r., Weistriz Polnisch - 1785 r., Nieder Weistritz - 1886 r., Bystrzyca Dolna - 1945."

internet

history of Bystrzyca Dolna

References

Bystrzyca Dolna